Marcos Witt is an American Christian music singer and pastor. Witt is considered one of the most influential and famous Spanish speaking figures of Christian music.

Biography
Witt was the second of three children born to Jerry and Nola Witt, a young American missionary couple. The Witt family moved to Durango, Mexico, in 1960 and started a missionary outreach. Jerry was killed when his small aircraft was shot down in 1964 while he was dropping gospels of St. John over small villages in Mexico. Nola Witt continued the mission work after his death. Some years later, she married Frank Warren. Together, they began to build new churches in Durango, Mexico. The couple had two children.

Witt's education began with basic studies at the American School of Durango. He then studied classical music at the University of Juarez (Durango, Mexico) and eventually started his theological studies at the International Bible College in San Antonio, Texas. Currently, Witt is working towards his master's degree at Oral Roberts University in Tulsa, Oklahoma.

Career
In 1986, Witt founded CanZion Producciones when he recorded his first album, Canción a Dios. He has recorded 30 albums that are available on cassette, CD, and DVD. Witt has sold over 27,000,000 copies of his records in Mexico, the United States and Latin America.

In 1994, Witt founded CanZion Institute, a school dedicated to the preparation of worship leaders and music ministers. Twenty years later there are over 3,000 students attending the 28 campuses of the Institute in 10 different countries throughout the United States, Latin America, and Europe.

Witt has written ten books, including Adoremos, which has been translated to English, Portuguese, and French, and Qué hacemos con estos músicos, which has been translated into Portuguese. Between 2009 and 2012, more than 3,000,000 people attended Witt's concerts in some of the main venues of Latin America. Concerts have been held in such places as José Amalfitani Stadium in Argentina, Figali Convention Center in Panama, Estadio Cuscatlán in El Salvador, Estadio Monumental in Ecuador, Estadio El Campín in Colombia, Palacio de los Deportes and Estadio Azteca in México City.

In 2001, Witt received the Ritmo Latino Award by the People for his "outstanding musical career".

Starting in 2002, for ten years he served as pastor of the Spanish Christian congregation at the megachurch Lakewood Church in Houston, Texas. Witt frequently visits the White House for events as a representative of the evangelical Hispanic Community.

In September 2003, Witt received a Latin Grammy Award for Best Christian Album, for Sana Nuestra Tierra (Heal Our Land). In November of that same year, he recorded Recordando Otra Vez (Remembering Once Again) at the LA Sports Arena. This recording brought CanZion into the secular market because of its distribution agreement with Sony.

In 2004, Marcos received his second Latin Grammy for Best Christian Album for Recordando Otra Vez.

On November 2, 2006, Witt received his third Latin Grammy for Best Christian Album for his album Dios es Bueno (God is Good).

On October 31, 2006, he released the album Alegría (Joy), which was recorded live in Chile. On April 26, 2007, Alegría won a Latin Billboard Award for Best Christian/Gospel Album of the Year. Witt's daughter, Elena Witt, sang "Cristo, Amante de mi Alma" on the album Alegria. On November 8, 2007, Witt received his fourth Latin Grammy for Best Christian Album for Alegría.

On October 2, 2007, Witt released Sinfonía del Alma (Symphony from the Soul), which he recorded and dedicated to his father who had died a year earlier.

On November 15, 2012, Witt received his fifth Latin Grammy for Best Christian Album for his album 25 Concierto Conmemorativo (25 Memorial Concert).

Witt is also working with William Vanderbloemen as a strategic partner to his firm.

Most recently, Marcos Witt received backlash from many evangelicals due to his participation in an ecumenical event "CRECES" (an event in which Protestants and Catholics come together) in 2006. Though he released a video in which he states he is not ecumenical, he never addressed why he was at the event and would even scold secular reporters for asking about the matter. Subsequently, another video from a 2016 event of the same organization shows him addressing the attendees through a video played at the aforementioned event.

Personal life
In 1986, Marcos married Miriam Lee; they have four children. The couple's oldest child, Elena, is married to singer Harold Guerra, who is signed to CanZion Records, the recording company founded by Witt.

Discography

Bibliography
 Adoremos. Editorial Caribe: Distributed by Editorial Betania, 1993, 
 Qué hacemos con estos músicos?. Editorial Caribe, 1995, 
 A Worship-Filled Life. Creation House, 1998, 
 Enciende Una Luz. Casa Creacion, 2000, 
 Cómo Ejercer la Verdadera Autoridad. Casa Creacion, 2002, 
 Decida Bien. Casa Creacion, 2003, 
 Dile adiós a tus temores . Atria Books, 2007, 
 Los 8 habitos de los mejores líderes. Vida, 2014,

Awards

Latin Grammy Awards
2003: Sana Nuestra Tierra – Best Christian Album
2004: Recordando Otra Vez – Best Christian Album (Spanish Language)
2006: Dios es Bueno – Best Christian Album (Spanish Language)
2007: Alegría – Best Christian Album (Spanish Language)
2012: 25 Concierto Conmemorativo – Best Christian Album (Spanish Language)
2022: Viviré – Best Christian Album (Spanish Language)

GMA Dove Awards

AMCL Awards
 1987: Vocalista Masculino del Año
 1988: Artista del Año
 1989: Artista del Año
 1991: Tu y yo – Álbum Tradicional o popular del Año
 1992: Cuan Hermoso – Canción del Año
 1992: Te Anhelo – Álbum del Año
 1992: Productor del Año
 1995: Compositor del Año
 1995: Productor del Año
 1995: Temprano yo te buscare (en vivo) – Videoclip del Año
 1992: Venció – Álbum en Vivo del Año
 1996: Poderoso (en vivo) – Videoclip del Año
 1997: Amo a Cristo (en vivo Argentina 1995) – Videoclip del Año
 1998: Entrare a Jerusalem – Álbum Tradicional o Popular del Año
 1999: Enciende una Luz – Álbum del Año
 1999: Productor del Año
 1999: Enciende una Luz – Videoclip del Año
 2000: Homenaje a Jesus – Álbum en Vivo del Año
 2001: El Volvera – Álbum en Vivo del Año
 2004: Recordando Otra Vez – Álbum Tradicional o Popular del Año
 2004: Autor de la poesía Intervención Musical del Año – dueto con Maria del Sol-
 2006: Dios es Bueno  – Álbum en Vivo del Año
 2006: Lluvias de Ayer y Hoy – Álbum Tradicional o Popular del Año
 2006: Dios es Bueno DVD – DVD del Año
 2006: No es un Misterio Intervención Musical del Año – trio con Alex Campos y Coalo Zamorano-
 2007: Sinfonía del Alma – Álbum Instrumental/Clásico/Coral del Año
 2009: Sobrenatural DVD – DVD del Año
 2009: Sobrenatural DVD – Tour del Año
 2011: 25 Concierto Conmemorativo – Álbum en Vivo del Año
 2011: 25 Concierto Conmemorativo – DVD del Año
 2011: 25 Concierto Conmemorativo – Evento Musical del Año

References

American performers of Christian music
American male singer-songwriters
American Christian religious leaders
Christian writers
American emigrants to Mexico
Latin Grammy Award winners
Oral Roberts University alumni
People from San Antonio
Singers from Durango
Writers from Durango
Promise Keepers
Living people
Performers of contemporary Christian music
Spanish-language singers of the United States
Singer-songwriters from Texas
20th-century American pianists
American male pianists
21st-century American pianists
20th-century American male musicians
21st-century American male musicians
1962 births